For information on all University of South Dakota sports, see South Dakota Coyotes
The South Dakota Coyotes football program is the intercollegiate American football team for the University of South Dakota located in the U.S. state of South Dakota. The team competes in the NCAA Division I Football Championship Subdivision (FCS) and are members of the Missouri Valley Football Conference. South Dakota's first football team was fielded in 1889. The team plays its home games at the 9,100 seat DakotaDome in Vermillion, South Dakota.

History

Classifications
1952–1959: NAIA
1956–1972: NCAA College Division
1973–2007: NCAA Division II
2008–present: NCAA Division I FCS

Conference memberships
1889–1921: Independent
1922–2007: North Central Intercollegiate Athletic Conference
2008–2011: Great West Football Conference
2012–present: Missouri Valley Football Conference

Playoff appearances

NCAA Division II
The Coyotes appeared in the Division II playoffs four times. Their record was 4–4.

NCAA Division I-AA/FCS
The Coyotes have appeared in the FCS playoffs two times. Their record is 1–2.

Record versus Missouri Valley Football Conference
Records through the end of the 2016–2017 school year.

Notable former players
Notable alumni include:
 Byron Bullock
 Matt Chatham
 Kameron Cline
 Tom Compton
 Filip Filipovic
 Stefan Logan
 Ko Quaye
 Tyler Starr
 Chris Streveler
 Jamel White
 Ordell Braase

Future non-conference opponents 
Announced schedules as of November 28, 2022.

References

External links
 

 
American football teams established in 1889
1889 establishments in South Dakota